Mühlen is a municipality in the district of Murau in Styria, Austria.

Geography
Mühlen lies about 28 km southeast of Murau.

References

Cities and towns in Murau District